Matt Symons (born 4 August 1989) is an English retired rugby union player who played 200 career games in a career spanning 11 seasons. He won the Premiership with Harlequins in 2021.

Career
Symons has had an interesting route to the top. He started out in the Saracens youth system before leaving to pursue a career in rowing. An injury to his forearm ended his rowing career and saw him make a return to rugby. In 2011, he started playing professionally for Esher for whom he made 14 appearances.

2012 saw him head south to New Zealand where he set up base in Christchurch and initially saw action for the Canterbury B side and Crusaders Knights development team before being named in the  squad for the 2013 ITM Cup.

On 25 March 2015, Symons returned to his home nation to sign for London Irish in the Aviva Premiership from the 2015-16 season following Chiefs assistant coach Tom Coventry to the English side.

On 28 June it was confirmed that Symons had terminated his contract with London Irish after their relegation to the Green King IPA Championship and signed for former London rival Wasps.

On 23 May 2018, Symons would sign for Premiership rivals Harlequins from the 2018-19 season.

He started in the Premiership final against Exeter on 26 June 2021 as Harlequins won the game 40-38 in the highest scoring Premiership final ever.

References

1989 births
Living people
English rugby union players
Canterbury rugby union players
Esher RFC players
London Irish players
Wasps RFC players
Harlequin F.C. players
Chiefs (rugby union) players
Rugby union locks
Rugby union players from Harlow